Chelis simplonica is a moth in the family Erebidae. It was described by Jean Baptiste Boisduval in 1840. It is found in the Alps of Switzerland, France and Italy. It has also been recorded from the Cantabrian Mountains north-western Spain. The habitat consists of mountain meadows and pastures.

Adults are on wing in July.

The larvae are polyphagous and have been recorded feeding on Galium, Plantago and Achillea species. The larvae overwinter twice.

References

External links

Lepiforum e.V.

Arctiina
Moths described in 1840
Moths of Europe